Liverpool is an unincorporated community in Jackson and Roane counties, West Virginia, United States. The community was named after Liverpool, in England.

References

Unincorporated communities in Jackson County, West Virginia
Unincorporated communities in Roane County, West Virginia
Unincorporated communities in West Virginia